The Outside Woman is a lost 1921 American comedy film directed by Sam Wood and written by Douglas Bronston. The film stars Wanda Hawley, Clyde Fillmore, Sidney Bracey, Rosita Marstini, Misao Seki, and Thena Jasper. The film was released in February 1921, by Realart Pictures Corporation.

Cast   
Wanda Hawley as Dorothy Ralston
Clyde Fillmore as Dr. Frederick Ralston
Sidney Bracey as Mr. Cambridge
Rosita Marstini as Mrs. Cambridge
Misao Seki as Togo
Thena Jasper as Gussie
Mary Winston as Mrs. Trent
Jacob Abrams as Curator

References

External links

1921 films
1920s English-language films
Silent American comedy films
1921 comedy films
Films directed by Sam Wood
American silent feature films
Lost American films
American black-and-white films
1921 lost films
Lost comedy films
1920s American films